Cinzia De Carolis (born 22 March 1960) is an Italian actress, voice actress, dialogue writer, dubbing director and singer. She appeared in more than fifteen films since 1968 including her performance as Lori in The Cat o' Nine Tails.

Selected filmography

References

External links 

1960 births
Living people
Actresses from Rome
Italian child actresses
Italian film actresses
Italian television actresses
Italian voice actresses